Jack Griffin was an American Negro league outfielder in the 1900s.

Griffin made his Negro leagues debut in 1907 with the Birmingham Giants and played for Birmingham again the following season. He played for the San Antonio Black Bronchos in 1909.

References

External links
Baseball statistics and player information from Baseball-Reference Black Baseball Stats and Seamheads

Year of birth missing
Year of death missing
Place of birth missing
Place of death missing
Birmingham Giants players
San Antonio Black Bronchos players